Arjun Rampal (born 26 November 1972) is an Indian film actor, model, film producer and television personality who works in Hindi films. He made his acting debut in Pyaar Ishq Aur Mohabbat. He was nominated for the Filmfare Award for Best Male Debut for the movie and won the Screen Award for Most Promising Newcomer – Male and IIFA Award for Star Debut of the Year - Male. He has won numerous awards including the National Film Award for Best Supporting Actor.

Apsara Film & Television Producers Guild Awards

AXN Action Awards

Filmfare Awards

International Indian Film Academy Awards

National Film Awards

Screen Awards

Stardust Awards

Zee Cine Awards

Other honours
In 2010, Times of India listed Rampal at #8 in the 50 Most Desirable Men list of the year. 
In 2011, Rampal was ranked at #10. 
In 2012, Rampal was declared the "Most Desirable Man" of the year, beating 49 other men including actors, politicians and sportsmen. 
In 2012, Rampal also received the PowerBrands Hall of Fame Award for Dynamic personality – Cinema.

References

Lists of awards received by Indian actor
Arjun Rampal